New Zealand national cricket team toured South Africa from 25 October to 2 December 2007 and played two Test matches, three ODI matches and one T20I match.

Squads

Lou Vincent was called up to the Test squad to replace Fulton.
Iain O'Brien was called up to the Test squad to replace Mills. Mills returned to the Test squad to replace Bond who was injured during the first Test.
Jamie How was called up to the Test squad on 11 November.
Chris Martin was called up to the ODI squad to replace Franklin.
Craig Cumming was called up to the ODI squad on 9 November.

Test series

1st Test

2nd Test

Only T20I

ODI series

1st ODI

2nd ODI

3rd ODI

References

External links
 Tour home at ESPNcricinfo

2007 in South African cricket
2007–08 South African cricket season
International cricket competitions in 2007–08
2007-08
2007 in New Zealand cricket